Nannoglanis fasciatus is a species of three-barbeled catfish endemic to Ecuador where it is found in the Napo River basin.  This species grows to a length of  SL.  This species is currently the only recognized member of its genus.

References
 

Heptapteridae
Taxa named by George Albert Boulenger
Fish of South America
Freshwater fish of Ecuador
Monotypic ray-finned fish genera